Calle Mangubat or C. Mangubat Street is a historic street and one of the two oldest roads now in Mactan Island in the Philippines.

Located in the region formerly called "Opong or Opon" now officially named Barangay Poblacion in  Lapu-Lapu City. the road was known as Calle Mangubat during the Spanish Colonial time and It is the street where the old municipal public market stands.
 
it runs parallel and next to the old town Plaza before "F. Martir Street" and "Wisdom Road" (the two roads that now separates the old town Plaza and Calle Mangubat) were created. 
It is bounded to the East by Opon-Mactan Road (now called G.Y dela Serna Street and M.L Quezon Ave.)
and to the West by Calle LapuLapu (now renamed BM Dimataga Street).

The time Mactan Island was resettled led by Gabriel Lazaro Mangubat he founded a small community in Mactan Island in 1600s in OPON facing the main Island of Cebu.

this small settlement was later known as "Pueblo de Opon en la Ysla de Mactan" or the town of Opon in the Island of Mactan and was the first and only settlement at that time.

Ever since the original inhabitants of Mactan Island joined the Spanish the Island was depopulated and abandoned  as the native volunteered war and conquest, joined the Spanish expeditions and left the Island "to wage war" against native kingdoms,

They settled in the newly founded Pueblos (hispanized Filipino native villages) or newly conquered territories throughout the Philippine Archipelago  during the time of the pacification of Luzon, Mindanao and the conquest Borneo.
 
Mangubat Street was named by Lazaro Mangubat as "Calle Mangubat" and part of the design and creation of the original Pueblo in Opon together with Bartolome Mangubat Dimataga Street or B.M. Dimataga Street as "Calle LapuLapu" in memory of his father Datu Mangubat and grandfather Datu Lapu-Lapu the two former rulers of Mactan and Rajahs of Cebu in the 16th century. Lazaro Mangubat was the grandson of Lapulapu he was an Arm Bearer of Spain with a symbol blazoned in his Arm " a gold Pike (Lance) put on stick in a blue mantle" the "GOLD" symbolizes his Royal and Noble descent, the "PIKE" stand the Perfection of Military Affairs", the "STICK" stands for Authority and Jurisdiction, and the BLUE color stands for Loyalty to the Spanish Empire.

References

Streets in Cebu